The 1891 Manhattan Athletic Club football team was an American football team that represented the Manhattan Athletic Club in the American Football Union (AFU) during the 1891 college football season.

Schedule

References

Manhattan Athletic Club
Manhattan Athletic Club football seasons
Manhattan Athletic Club football